Dawu is a railway station on the Taiwan Railways Administration (TRA) South-link line located in Dawu Township, Taitung County, Taiwan.

History
The station was opened on 5 October 1992.

See also
 List of railway stations in Taiwan

References

1992 establishments in Taiwan
Railway stations in Taitung County
Railway stations opened in 1992
Railway stations served by Taiwan Railways Administration